Diacrotricha guttuligera is a moth of the family Pterophoridae. It is known from New Guinea.

References

External links
Papua Insects

Pterophorini
Moths described in 1952
Moths of New Guinea
Taxa named by Alexey Diakonoff